Fabbri is an Italian surname.

Fabbri may also refer to:

 Fabbri Group, an Italian amusement rides manufacturer, based in Bergantino
 Fratelli Fabbri Editori, an Italian publishing house now part of Rcs MediaGroup
 Fabbri and Partners Ltd., an English publishing house
 Via Paolo Fabbri 43, an album by Francesco Guccini
 Fabbri, a locality (or frazione) of the commune of Montefalco, Perugia, Italy